Cindrel Mountains (also known as  Cândrel Mountains, Cibin Mountains, or the Szeben Alps) are a group of mountains in central Romania in the centre of the Southern Carpathians, in the North-East of the Parâng Mountains group.

Only two other peaks in the range rise above 2000 metres:  Balandrul Mare and Starpului.

Mount Cindrel was the site of the World War I Battle of Mount Csindrel, part of the 1916 Battle of Transylvania. 

Because the massif is easily accessible, the ethnographical area Mărginimea Sibiului has formed around the mountain, having sheep-herding and wood industry as the main occupations. On the Cibin and the Sadu rivers dams and hydro-electrical power plants were constructed, the oldest being the one from Sadu in 1896. The resort has developed around a small monastery in which the Romanian philosopher Constantin Noica spent the last part of his life.

The main river flowing from the mountain is the Cibin River, which collects most of the other smaller rivers. Between the Cindrel Mountains and the Transylvanian Plateau, the river forms a wide depression—the —in which the main city in the area, Sibiu, lies. The ethnographic region known as Mărginimea Sibiului is located there.

References

External links
 Information about the Carpathians Mountains

Mountain ranges of the Southern Carpathians
Geography of Sibiu County